Baby Jey is a Brooklyn-based indie rock band originally from Edmonton, Alberta, founded in 2015 by core members Jeremy Witten (guitar, keyboards, lead vocals), and Dean Kheroufi (bass, backing vocals). In 2017, Baby Jey started performing as a four-piece  band with the addition of Trevor McNeely (lap steel guitar) and Connor Ellinger (drums).

History 
Prior to forming Baby Jey, Jeremy Witten and Dean Kheroufi were active in other musical projects. From 2013 to 2015, Witten performed solo under the name Jey Witten, releasing two independent albums Jey Witten (2013) and The Wide Eyed (2014). As a solo performer, Witten was awarded at the Calgary Folk Music Festival's Songwriting Contest and he performed at the Canmore Folk Music Festival in 2014. At this time, Kheroufi continued to perform in other projects, including the Edmonton-based band The Velveteins.

Baby Jey's debut album Best Wishes was produced by Renny Wilson and released in May 2017. The Edmonton Journal called Best Wishes "oddly entertaining," and the album charted on CJSR-FM and the CKUA Radio Network. Best Wishes received favorable coverage in Canadian and American music blogs and podcasts. Following the release of their debut album, Baby Jey toured in Canada and the United States. Baby Jey have shared stages with artists such as Michael Rault, New Love Crowd, and Jessica Jalbert of Faith Healer.

In July 2018, Baby Jey announced that their sophomore album Someday Cowboy would be released on Brooklyn label Maintenance Records in September 2018. Following the release of Someday Cowboy, Baby Jey relocated to Brooklyn, New York. The lead single of the album, titled "Someday My Space Cowboy Will Come," was premiered by Indie88. In 2019, Baby Jey was nominated for an Edmonton Music Award in the People's Choice category.

Discography

Albums 

 Best Wishes (2017)
Someday Cowboy (2018)

Singles and EPs 

 Veneera (2018)

References

External links 

  (defunct)

Musical groups from Edmonton
Musical groups established in 2015
Canadian indie rock groups
Musical groups from Alberta
2015 establishments in Alberta
Musical groups from Brooklyn